State Road 78 (SR 78) is the Florida Department of Transportation designation of the highway that historically extended from Pine Island Center on the Gulf Coast of Florida to the northern tip of Lake Okeechobee. In the 1980s, two segments of the route were removed from state maintenance to county maintenance (and the road designations were changed to reflect the action). More recently, SR 78 signs were removed from the four-mile-long stretch of US 27/SR 25 that was once a concurrency. All three sections are signed east–west, even though the easternmost section is actually a north–south route.

Route description

Western section
The current western terminus of the westernmost piece of SR 78 is in northwest Cape Coral at an intersection with Stringfellow Rd beginning at “Pine Island Center”.  Known as Pine Island Road, it travels east from its terminus through northern Cape Coral toward North Fort Myers, Florida, where it intersects U.S. Route 41.  SR 78 becomes Bayshore Road in North Fort Myers at its intersection with U.S. Route 41 Business (which is part of an earlier alignment of US 41 and the Tamiami Trail).  Bayshore Road continues east paralleling the north shore of the Caloosahatchee River.  It intersects with Interstate 75 shortly before terminating at State Road 31 near the Lee County Civic Center.

Central section

The 14-mile-long central east–west section of SR 78 extends from SR 29 four miles (6 km) northeast of North LaBelle to an intersection with US 27/SR 25 midway between Citrus Center and Moore Haven. In between is the town of Ortona. The central section of SR 78 is entirely within a part of Glades County dedicated to the growth of foliage house plants.

Okeechobee (eastern) section
The 34-mile-long easternmost section of State Road 78 (SR 78) is signed east–west, even though the bulk of the road is north–south.  This stretch follows the western and northern edge of the Lake Okeechobee wetlands. The southern (“western”) terminus of this segment is an intersection with US 27/SR 25 near Moore Haven.  Motorists driving “east” (actually north) on SR 78, travel through Sportsman Village before visiting the Brighton Seminole Indian Reservation and Buckhead Ridge before reaching the northern (“eastern”) terminus, an intersection with US 98 (SR 700)-US 441 (SR 15) near Eagle Bay in the northern tip of Lake Okeechobee, roughly three miles to the south of Okeechobee.

History

In the late 1970s, FDOT started to put into motion a sequence of events that ultimately resulted in the removal of dozens of miles of roadway from the State maintenance list to county maintenance.  Entire State Roads disappeared as their FDOT designations were replaced by County Road signage, while other State Roads had only parts become County Roads (usually with no change in the numbering).

In the 1970s, State Road 78 extended from Pine Island Center, near Pine Island Sound on the Gulf Coast to the northernmost part of Lake Okeechobee. In the 1980s, two sections were transitioned to county maintenance:

 The westernmost six miles (from Pine Island Center to Cape Coral), also known as Northwest Pine Island Road, became County Road 78.  It runs from CR 767 (Stringfellow Road) on Pine Island east over the Matlacha Bridge onto the mainland in northwest Cape Coral, where it connect to SR 78.
 North River Road (22 miles of zigzagging road along the north bank of the Caloosahatchee River from SR 31 near Babcock Ranch to SR 29 near LaBelle) was also converted to County Road 78.  Brief concurrencies with both SR 31 and SR 29 were also removed.

County Road 78A

County Road 78A is a spur road off of State Road 78 between Cape Coral and North Fort Myers locally known as Pondella Road. It provides a quicker way for motorists traveling east on CR 78 to access Downtown Fort Myers. The road was known as SR 78A before 1980.

Major intersections

References

External links

Florida Route Log (SR 78)

078
078
078
078
078
078